The 2nd Mounted Brigade previously known as the 2/2nd South Western Mounted Brigade was a second line yeomanry brigade of the British Army during the First World War.

Raised after the declaration of war, it was a mirror formation of the first line 2nd South Western Mounted Brigade. It had under command the 2/1st Royal 1st Devon Yeomanry, the 2/1st Royal North Devon Yeomanry, and the 2/1st West Somerset Yeomanry. All of which were converted in cyclist units in 1916 or 1917 and the brigade, never having seen any active service, ceased to exist.

See also

 2nd South Western Mounted Brigade for the 1st Line formation
 British yeomanry during the First World War
 Second line yeomanry regiments of the British Army

References

Mounted Brigades of the British Army
Military units and formations established in 1914
Military units and formations disestablished in 1916